Elton John and his band set out on The One Tour just under a month prior to the album's release. The album proved a big success as did the world tour which lasted for two years.

Tour
This was John's first tour since his rehabilitation from drug and alcohol addictions and bulimia in 1990. This is the last tour to feature his Roland RD-1000 digital piano. He would start playing his current Yamaha Disklavier piano shortly after.

The first European leg lasted from 26 May to 21 July visiting 13 countries ending at Barcelona Mini Stadium during the 1992 Summer Olympics. The show, filmed in front of 30,000 fans, was released on VHS and later on DVD.

John and the band then moved on to the United States where The One was a commercial success. John returned to Dodger Stadium for two sold-out shows as well as another two at Shea Stadium. John also played six sold-out shows at Madison Square Garden, playing to approximately 120,000 people over the six shows. He finished the tour with two performances in Mexico, where he had never performed in concert before, and two in Buenos Aires, Argentina. The tour was seen by 3 million people over 130 shows.

The 1993 leg of the tour started with nineteen shows in Australia, four shows in Hong Kong, and two shows in Singapore, where John had never previously performed. The tour when went on to North America and then Europe. It ended in a concert in Istanbul, Turkey at the Istanbul Stadium on 20 June 1993.

As in Europe, John dedicated "The Show Must Go On" to Freddie Mercury and performed this number away from the keyboard, with a hand-held microphone. Also, he dedicated "The Last Song" to the people suffering from AIDS. George Michael appeared at Dodger Stadium performing "Don't Let the Sun Go Down on Me" with John as an encore.

Tour dates

1992 setlists

1993 setlists

Tour band
 Elton John – Roland RD-1000 digital piano and lead vocals
 Davey Johnstone – guitars/backing vocals
 Bob Birch – bass
 Mark Taylor – keyboards/guitar 
 Guy Babylon – keyboards
 Charlie Morgan – drums
 Mortonette Jenkins – backing vocals
 Marlena Jeter – backing vocals
 Natalie Jackson – backing vocals

Notes

References

External links

 Information Site with Tour Dates

Elton John concert tours
1992 concert tours
1993 concert tours